Mamta Sharma is an Indian playback singer. She is known for the song "Munni Badnaam Hui" from Dabangg and "Tinku Jiya" from Yamla Pagla Deewana. The songs were chartbusters and fetched her several awards and nominations, including a Filmfare award for Best Playback Singer (Female).

Early life
Sharma was  born in Birla Nagar, Gwalior, Madhya Pradesh. She completed her studies from Saint Paul's School Morar Gwalior. In school, she actively performed on stage. Later she also performed at various family events (marriage receptions, parties) with her band.

Career
Before singing for Bollywood, Bengali, she lent her voice to many Bhojpuri albums She was spotted by music director Lalit Pandit who got her first break in super hit movie, Dabangg, with the item song, Munni Badnaam Hui. She also has sung the super hit song Kevvu Keka in the Telugu remake of Dabangg, Gabbar Singh. She later gave hit songs like 'Fevicol Se' & 'Tooh'.

Discography

Accolades

Wins
 17th Annual Star Screen Awards, 2011 – Karbonn Mobiles Best New Talent in Music Best Playback Singer (Female)
 6th Apsara Film Producers Guild Awards, 2011 – Best Playback Singer (Female)
 56th Filmfare Awards, 2011 – Best Playback Singer (Female)
 12th IIFA Awards, Toronto, 2011 – Best Playback singer (Female)
 Mirchi Music Awards, 2010 – Upcoming Female Vocalist of The Year
 Mirchi Music Awards, 2010 – Female Vocalist of The Year
Apsara Film & producers Guild Awards 2013– for most popular film song on Radio by 93.5 Red FM For "FEVICOL SE" from the Film "Dabangg 2".

Nominations
 1st BIG Star Entertainment Awards, 2010 – Best Playback Singer (Female)
 Zee Cine Awards, 2011 – Best Playback Singer (Female)
 Stardust Awards, 2011 – New Music Sensation (Female)
 2nd South Indian International Movie Awards, 2013 – Best Female Playback Singer for "Kevvu Keka" from Gabbar Singh
 2nd South Indian International Movie Awards, 2013 – Best Female Playback Singer for "123 Mike Testing" from Yaare Koogadali

See also
List of Indian playback singers

References

External links 
 

1980 births
Living people
People from Gwalior
Indian women playback singers
Bollywood playback singers
Kannada playback singers
Telugu playback singers
Tamil playback singers
Nepali-language singers from India
Bengali playback singers
Indian folk-pop singers
21st-century Indian women singers
21st-century Indian singers
Women musicians from Madhya Pradesh
Singers from Madhya Pradesh
Bigg Boss contestants
Filmfare Awards winners
Screen Awards winners
International Indian Film Academy Awards winners